The Women's time trial C4 road cycling event at the 2012 Summer Paralympics took place on September 5 at Brands Hatch. Six riders from five different nations competed. The race distance was 16 km.

Results

References

Women's road time trial C4
2012 in women's road cycling